Trachyzelotes is a genus of ground spiders that was first described by H. Lohmander in 1944 as a subgenus of Zelotes, and was raised to genus status in 1967.

Species
 it contains twenty-two species:
Trachyzelotes adriaticus (Caporiacco, 1951) – Italy to China
Trachyzelotes ansimensis Seo, 2002 – Korea
Trachyzelotes baiyuensis Xu, 1991 – China
Trachyzelotes barbatus (L. Koch, 1866) – Mediterranean to Caucasus. Introduced to USA.
Trachyzelotes bardiae (Caporiacco, 1928) – Mediterranean
Trachyzelotes chybyndensis Tuneva & Esyunin, 2002 – Russia (Europe), Kazakhstan
Trachyzelotes cumensis (Ponomarev, 1979) – Ukraine, Russia (Europe), Azerbaijan, Kazakhstan
Trachyzelotes fuscipes (L. Koch, 1866) – Mediterranean, Kazakhstan, China
Trachyzelotes glossus (Strand, 1915) – Turkey, Israel
Trachyzelotes holosericeus (Simon, 1878) – Mediterranean
Trachyzelotes huberti Platnick & Murphy, 1984 – Algeria, Italy, Albania
Trachyzelotes jaxartensis (Kroneberg, 1875) – Northern Africa to Caucasus, Russia (Europe) to Central Asia, Iran. Introduced to Hawaii, USA, Mexico, South Africa, India, China
Trachyzelotes kulczynskii (Bösenberg, 1902) – Macedonia, Bulgaria. Introduced to USA, Caribbean, Colombia, Brazil, Japan, Samoa
Trachyzelotes lyonneti (Audouin, 1826) – Macaronesia, Mediterranean to Central Asia. Introduced to USA, Mexico, Peru, Brazil
Trachyzelotes malkini Platnick & Murphy, 1984 – Romania, Albania, Macedonia, Bulgaria, Greece, Ukraine, Russia (Europe, Caucasus), Turkey, Iran, Kazakhstan
Trachyzelotes manytchensis Ponomarev & Tsvetkov, 2006 – Russia (Europe), Iran
Trachyzelotes miniglossus Levy, 2009 – Israel, Iran
Trachyzelotes minutus Crespo, 2010 – Portugal
Trachyzelotes mutabilis (Simon, 1878) – Mediterranean, Romania
Trachyzelotes pedestris (C. L. Koch, 1837) (type) – Europe, Caucasus, Turkey, Iran
Trachyzelotes ravidus (L. Koch, 1875) – Ethiopia
Trachyzelotes stubbsi Platnick & Murphy, 1984 – Greece, Cyprus

References

Araneomorphae genera
Gnaphosidae